Camera Headlines was an early American television series that aired from January 1948 to 1949 on the DuMont Television Network.

Broadcast history
DuMont's previous national news program, The Walter Compton News, had premiered on DuMont station WTTG in June 1947, then on the DuMont network on August 25, 1947, but was off the air by January 1948. This show had movie publicist Compton (1912-1959) reading news from a script with the occasional use of slides.

Premiering in January 1948, Camera Headlines was an attempt by DuMont to present a TV news program using newsreel film footage. As with some other early television programs, there is conflicting information about the show, with some sources reporting that the series was 30 minutes long, while other sources stating it was 15 minutes long. Camera Headlines aired Monday through Friday at 7:30 pm Eastern Time, with I.N.S. Telenews following at 7:45pm on Tuesdays only.

Camera Headlines also aired weekdays 12:30 to 12:45pm ET. The DuMont daytime schedule beginning in January 1949 was:

10-10:30am   Johnny Olson's Rumpus Room
10:30-11am  Welcome, Neighbors
11am-12noon  The Stan Shaw Show
12noon-12:15pm   Amanda
12:15-12:30pm  Man in the Street
12:30-12:45pm  Camera Headlines
12:45-1pm   Fashions in Song
1-1:30pm   Okay, Mother
2:30-3pm  Inside Photoplay (The Wendy Barrie Show)
3-3:15pm  The Needle Shop
3:15-3:30pm  Vincent Lopez Speaking (The Vincent Lopez Show)

Episode status
As with most DuMont programs, no episodes of Camera Headlines are known to survive. Little else is known about the series, even though it aired on a major United States television network.

See also
The Walter Compton News
I.N.S. Telenews
DuMont Evening News
Television news in the United States
List of programs broadcast by the DuMont Television Network
List of surviving DuMont Television Network broadcasts
1948-49 United States network television schedule

References

Bibliography
David Weinstein, The Forgotten Network: DuMont and the Birth of American Television (Philadelphia: Temple University Press, 2004) 
Alex McNeil, Total Television, Fourth edition (New York: Penguin Books, 1980) 
Tim Brooks and Earle Marsh, The Complete Directory to Prime Time Network TV Shows, Third edition (New York: Ballantine Books, 1964)

External links
 
DuMont historical website

DuMont Television Network original programming
1948 American television series debuts
1949 American television series endings
Black-and-white American television shows
1940s American television news shows
English-language television shows
Lost television shows
DuMont news programming